Zakaria Hashemi (born in 1936 in Rey, Tehran Province, Iran) is an Iranian actor and film director.

Early life 
Hashemi spent his childhood in southern Tehran.

Career 
He has acted in several films including The Night of the Hunchback, The Brick and the Mirror. He also directed some films, like The Gamble. In the film The Brick and the Mirror (dir. Ebrahim Golestan), Hashemi plays a taxi driver named Hashem who finds a baby in the back of his cab, left by a woman in a black chador (Forough Farrokhzad).

Filmography 
As actor:
 South of the City (1958)
 The Night of the Hunchback (1958)
 The Brick and the Mirror (1965)
 Diamond 33 (1966)
 Goodbye Friend (1971)
 Topoli (1972)
 Kaniz (1974)
 Sanjar (1976)
 Charlotte be bazarche miayad (1977)
 Tuti (1978)
 Hokm-e tir (1979)
 Paygah-e jahannami (1984)
 Rooted in Blood (1984)

As director:
 Knucklebones (1971)
 Zan-e bakere (1973)
 Tuti (1978)

Books 
 The Parrot

References 

1936 births
Living people
People from Ray, Iran
Iranian screenwriters
Iranian film directors
Iranian male novelists
Iranian male film actors
Iranian cinematographers